Calliphara regalis is a species of insect in the family Scutelleridae (Hemiptera).

Description
The basic body color is deep green with metallic reflections. The pattern may vary considerably, but usually these insects show dorsally five or seven large spots, more or less fused.

Distribution
This species can be found in Australia and Indonesia.

References

Scutelleridae
Hemiptera of Asia
Insects described in 1775
Taxa named by Johan Christian Fabricius